Maravanthuruthu is a small village located in the Kottayam district of Kerala in India. It is surrounded by the river Muvattupuzha and is connected to the neighbouring villages Thalayolaparambu, Enādi by recently constructed bridges. In January 2023, when Kerala was chosen by the New York Times as one among the 52 must-see tourist destinations in the world, Maravanthur got a special mention for its rurality. As part of the tourism mission's STREET project (Sustainable, Tangible, Responsible, Experiential, Ethnic, Tourism), Kerala's first water street was started in Maravanthur.

Etymology
Mara means Veda, Thuruth means island.

Grama Panchayat
Maravanthuruthu is one of the Grama Panchayats in Vaikom Taluk.

Economy
Maravanthuruthu has moved out of the status so called "village" and now is an upcoming urban area, being settled by the people who are rich in education, migrants from other part of Kerala who were attracted to this urban village due to abundance of fresh water, culture and peaceful living atmosphere.

Transportation
The main point which attracts the outsiders is that maravanthuruthu now serves as a link to the lengthy Kottayam - Ernakulam road by reducing the distance to an approximate 8–12 km through three bridges, which is Panjippalam, Vaalampilly paalam and Palamkadavu paalam. One more junction which is known as Kadookkara junction is another traffic junction (no traffic signals can be seen though) from which a de-route is available to reach the main road through a narrow bridge called Enady palam.

Places of worship
Maravanthuruthu is rich in culture and religious unity with more than a couple of temples - Sree Krishnan Thrikkovil, Melpparambathu Kshethram, Sree Subraminiyan Kshethram, Maniyassery Vaishnava Gandharva Swamy Temple, a mosque and a Jacobite church. All festivals in these devotional places are taken over by the community together and celebrated in unity showing respect to their culture, tradition and human values which unites the entire Maravanthuruthu Nivaasikal (community/People) together. Apart from a few incidents during 2000–2001 which ended up in homicide of one individual, no other such incidents are reported.

Geography
Maravanthuruthu covers nearly 5–6 ms through the main road and triples the size towards both the sides ending up near the river. The entire main route is inhibited by the local residents which was once seen with traditional houses which can be rarely seen now due to the uplift of living standards of people and those houses are now converted to modern houses and every resident own a vehicle of their own.

Panchayath junction
The main junction is called Panchayathu Junction which is right next to the Sree Krishnan Thrikkovil and Sree Subhramaniyan Swami Kshethram. Few buildings serve as a shopping arcade and shops are run by local residents. Every junction or street (marked within 3 km) conducts yearly sports and cultural activities. The skit run during Onam is one among the main activities which attracts outsiders. Characters in ancient stories are depicted and people making those characters are carried in lorries (open trucks) through the road which is one of the main attraction during Onam Celebrations. These procession is followed by ancient cultural forms known as Pulikali, Theyyam etc.

Kadookkara Junction
Recent rise of importance to the Kadookkara junction due to its geographical location serving the main junction where all the roads meet has taken of the importance of Panchayath Junction but still Panchayat junction serves as a main spot due to the Panchayat Office and Government Dispensary and a veterinary hospital.

Politics
The people of Maravanthuruthu maintain strong political values and the main political parties is UDF and LDF. Even though Maravanthuruthu has not been a part of any political upfronts or has not contributed any known leaders to the country, its political importance remains due to the number of residents.

Education
The main highlight of Maravanthuruthu is that 80-90% of the population (Modern Generation) is educated and the people of age category 22-25 holds a graduation or master certificates thus making Maravanthuruthu one among the high literal place.

Water sources
The most important factor which makes Maravanthuruthu distinct from all other places is the abundance of fresh drinking water. All houses are equipped with own well which is rich in fresh drinking water. It has been noted that the Construction Giants have recently planned to start up certain ventures like Compound Villas, resorts etc. in Maravanthuruthu, but still Maravanthuruthu remains in peace and beauty surrounded by its rivers, paddy fields and beautiful people.

Religious Places

 Sree Krishna Swamy Temple
 Sree Velayudha Swamy Temple
 Melparambathdevi temple 
 Maniyassery Vaishnava Gandharva Swamy Kshethram
 Jacobite Church
  Orthodox Christian church

References

http://lsgkerala.in/maravanthuruthu 
http://www.lsg.kerala.gov.in/pages/lb_general_info.php?intID=5&ID=501&ln=ml
http://lsgkerala.in/maravanthuruthu/history/

External links
 Maravanthuruthu
 Official Web site of Kerala
 Official Web site of Kottatam District

Villages in Kottayam district